The Aquilair Kid is a French ultralight trike designed and produced by Aquilair of Theizé. The aircraft is supplied as a kit for amateur construction or as a complete ready-to-fly-aircraft.

Design and development
It features a cable-braced hang glider-style high-wing, weight-shift controls, a single-seat open cockpit, tricycle landing gear and a single engine in pusher configuration.

The aircraft is made from metal tubing, with its wing covered in Dacron sailcloth. Its  span Star 12 wing is supported by a single tube-type kingpost and uses an "A" frame weight-shift control bar. The standard powerplant is a twin cylinder, air-cooled, two-stroke, dual-ignition  Rotax 503 engine, with the  Rotax 447  and the  liquid-cooled Rotax 582  optional.

The aircraft is supplied in modular form, with the chassis, engine, reduction drive and propeller all available separately. A number of different wings can be fitted to the basic carriage, but the Star 12 was formerly the standard wing offered. The chassis incorporates an under-seat pivot system that allows the wing to be mounted and then raised into position.

Variants
Kid 447
Aircraft with the twin cylinder, air-cooled, two-stroke, single-ignition  Rotax 447  and the 
Kid 503
Aircraft with the twin cylinder, air-cooled, two-stroke, dual-ignition  Rotax 503 engine
Kid 582
Aircraft with the twin cylinder, liquid-cooled, two-stroke, dual-ignition  Rotax 582 engine

Specifications (Kid 503 with Star 12 wing)

References

External links

2000s French sport aircraft
2000s French ultralight aircraft
Homebuilt aircraft
Single-engined pusher aircraft
Ultralight trikes
Aquilair aircraft